Giovanni Giorgio may refer to:
 Giovanni Giorgio Moroder, an Italian record producer
 Giovanni Di Giorgio (1914–1992), an Italian painter
 Gian Giorgio Trissino (equestrian), an Italian horse rider
 John George, Marquess of Montferrat